41 Entertainment LLC (41E) is a privately held American animation company that develops, produces, and distributes popular television shows. Allen Bohbot is the founder and managing director of 41E.

History 
Allen Bohbot founded Bohbot Kids Network (BKN) and various subsidiaries in the 1990s and 41 Entertainment on January 7, 2010. 41E started a new wholly owned subsidiary called BKN Entertainment in November 2018 to manage its library titles initially produced by BKN.

In September 2011, 41E was appointed by Namco, and Bandai Namco Games, to distribute worldwide the new series Pac-Man 3D, which later became known as Pac-Man and the Ghostly Adventures. 41E collaborated with Avi Arad, Rick Ungar, Tom Ruegger, and Paul Rugg for the project. In May 2012, 41E entered into partnerships with Striker Entertainment and The CDM Company to begin a licensing program for Pac-Man and the Ghostly Adventures. Throughout 2012 and into 2013, 41E expanded their licensing program and partnered with licensees and agents worldwide for the Pac-Man and the Ghostly Adventure series. In June 2013, Bandai Namco Games commissioned the production of an additional 13 episodes for Season II. With the additional seasons, many worldwide broadcasters acquired the show. In January 2014, another 13 episodes were commissioned bringing Pac-Man and the Ghostly Adventures to 52 episodes in total. In July 2014, 41E entered into a licensing and merchandising agreement with BNGI on their Pac-Man property. 41E licensed classic Pac-Man worldwide, excluding Japan, to multiple manufacturers.

In October 2014, Netflix announced that it entered into an agreement with 41E and Arad Animation for a new original series called Kong: King of the Apes. In 2015, 41E entered into an agreement with Edgar Rice Burroughs, Inc. for the creation of the animated series Edgar Rice Burroughs' Tarzan and Jane. 41E acquired the right to develop and distribute the animation worldwide and represent the property globally for licensing and merchandising. In June 2015, 41E announced its partnership with Netflix on Edgar Rice Burroughs' Tarzan and Jane. The animation was produced by Avi Arad and ARC Productions, which was acquired by Jam Filled Entertainment who completed the project. In June 2016, Netflix renewed Kong – King of the Apes for a second season. In October 2016, 41E and Netflix announced another original series, Super Monsters. The animation is produced by Avi Arad.

In September 2017, 41E announced an agreement with Activision Blizzard Studios as the exclusive global sales agent for Linear Television and home entertainment distribution of the animated series Skylanders Academy. In September 2017, 41E announced the production and distribution of a major all new original animated series, to be produced by 41 Studios, entitled Shooting Star. In September 2017, 41E announced the production and distribution of a major all new original animated series to be produced by 41 Studios, entitled The Mini Musketeers. In May 2018, Season 2 of the Netflix original series Kong: King of the Apes launched with consists of ten half-hour episodes. In September 2018, 41E announced a new franchise featuring an action-comedy series for kids, S.M.A.S.H! which was created and executive produced by Allen Bohbot based on an original idea by Kaaren Lee Brown, developed for Television by Kaaren Lee Brown and Kiersten Halstead, and illustrated by Mel Bontrager. In October 2018, Season 2 of the Netflix series Super Monsters launched with eight half-hour episodes. In October 2018, Season 2 of the Netflix series Tarzan and Jane launched with five half-hour episodes. 

41E's subsidiaries are Super Monsters Animation LLC, T&J Animation LLC, Kong-King of the Apes LLC, SMASH Animation LLC, Shooting Star Animation LLC, TWA Animation LLC, and BKN Entertainment LLC.

Headquarters 
The headquarters of 41E is located in Greenwich, Connecticut. 41E also has a satellite office in Spain.

List of 41E productions

Sources

References

External links

American animation studios
American companies established in 2010
Mass media companies established in 2010
2010 establishments in Connecticut